Post-Apocalypto Tour was a concert tour by American comedy rock band Tenacious D. The tour was in support of the band's YouTube animatic series Tenacious D in Post-Apocalypto and its accompanying soundtrack album Post-Apocalypto, which were released in November 2018. The tour began on November 3, 2018 and ended on February 26, 2020. This tour surpassed the band's 2012 Rize of the Fenix Tour as the longest Tenacious D tour in October 2019 with over 1.8 million people.

Unlike other Tenacious D tours, this tour had a substantial gap from January to May 2019 where there were no performances. Black would later claim that the reason for this hiatus is due to him being required to film Jumanji: The Next Level.

The band confirmed the end of the Post-Apocalypto Tour on March 2, 2020, stating that they would commence on their "The Purple Nurple Tour... Twisting Hard to the Left!" in the United States through September and October 2020, partnering with 46 for 46 to raise awareness of voting for the 2020 United States presidential election, particularity the swing states. The tour was later cancelled due to the COVID-19 pandemic.

History 
This tour was primarily in support of Tenacious D in Post-Apocalypto, a hand-drawn animatic series which was released on YouTube from September to November in 2018. The series was entirely drawn by Black, and solely written and voiced by Black and Gass. The vast majority of performances on this tour featured a large front-drop curtain screen, which had visuals from the episodes projected onto it. When the songs played, the curtain was see-through, and revealed Black and Gass performing. A special, shortened cut of the episodes was created to be played in-between the songs for the tour. Due to most outdoor venues being unable to accommodate the curtain, the band skipped the vast majority of the Post-Apocalypto songs at festivals and amphitheatres, starting the performance with "JB Jr. Rap" onwards, and then with a large backdrop of a crudely-drawn castle which was erected during "Rize of the Fenix".

The performance at Red Rocks Amphitheatre in Colorado on July 25, 2019 featured the Colorado Symphony orchestra throughout the performance.

The July performance at the Palace Theater was broadcast on Oculus Rift.

The performance at Rock in Rio Festival in Brazil on September 28, 2019 featured Internet sensation Junior Bass Groovador on a cover of "Smells Like Teen Spirit" by Nirvana.

The performances on the February 2020 European leg featured subtitles in the country's respective languages.

Average set list 
Post-Apocalypto Set
 "Hope"
 "Making Love"
 "Take Us Into Space"
 "Fuck Yo-Yo Ma"
 "Daddy Ding Dong"
 "Robot"
 "Colors"
 "JB. Jr Rap"
 "Woman Time"
 "Save the World"
 "Post-Apocalypto Theme (Reprise)"
Greatest Hits Set
"Rize of the Fenix"
 "Low Hangin' Fruit"
 "Sax-a-Boom"
"Roadie"
 "Kickapoo"
 "Beelzeboss (The Final Showdown)"
 "The Metal"
 "Dio"
 "Kielbasa"
 "Tribute"
 "Double Team"

 Encore
 "Fuck Her Gently"

Opening acts 

Acoustic duo Wynchester, composed of longtime Tenacious D guitarist John Konesky, alongside Kyle Gass Band vocalist, Mike Bray, opened for every night of the tour, excluding festivals and support appearances. The band released their self-titled debut album Wynchester in May 2018.

Tour dates 

All events highlighted with (*) mean that the show was without the projection curtain. This could be due to the venue being outdoors, or logistical problems with the venue.

Personnel 

 Jack Black – lead vocals, additional guitar
 Kyle Gass – lead guitar, additional vocals, flute
 John Konesky – electric guitar, additional vocals
 John Spiker – bass guitar, additional vocals
 Scott Seiver – drums

See also 

Tenacious D in Post-Apocalypto
Post-Apocalypto

References

External links 

 Official site

Tenacious D concert tours
2018 concert tours
2019 concert tours
2020 concert tours